Dulcy Fankam (born July 26, 1999) is a Cameroonian basketballer. She plays for South Florida Bulls women's basketball and the Cameroon national basketball team

High school
She attended Lycee Manegauba Nkongsamba in her hometown and ranked No. 3 overall in Cameroon coming out of high school.

College
Dulcy previously played for Walters State Community College in Morristown, in her junior year(2018-2019). In her one season at Walters, she averaged 15.5 points, 8.8 rebounds, and 1.6 blocks per game, also 18.1 points and 9.5 rebounds per game in conference play. And she was named the "TCCAA Women’s Co-Most Valuable Player".

She then transferred to University of South Florida(2019-2020) and in 31 games she averaged 12.2 points and 8.6 rebounds per game.

National team career
She helped her native country, Cameroon, to the semifinals of the 2021 FIBA AfroBasket in September.

Had 16 points, 18 rebounds, three blocked shots, and three steals in a 67–61 win over Egypt in the quarterfinals.

Career honours
 AAC All-Conference Second Team (2021–22)
 Preseason AAC All-Conference First Team (2021–22)
 AAC Player of the Week (Jan. 25, 2021)
 AAC Weeklly Honor Roll (Dec. 2, 2020, Dec. 14, 2020)
 Preseason AAC −All-Conference Second Team (2020–21)

References

Living people
1999 births